Donald L. Moffitt (born February 18, 1947) is a former Republican member of the Illinois House of Representatives, representing the 94th District from 1993 to 2003 and the 74th district from 2003 until 2017.

Moffitt previously served as Knox County Treasurer from 1984 to 1993, Knox County Board Chairman from 1982 to 1984, Knox County Board member 1978 to 1982, Knoxville, Illinois Alderman 1977 to 1978, Mayor of the City of Oneida, Illinois from 1972 to 1975, and an Oneida Alderman from 1971 to 1972. Moffitt resides in Knoxville, Ill., with his wife, Carolyn. He has three grown children.

On January 24, 2017, Governor Bruce Rauner nominated Moffitt to become the Assistant Director for the Illinois Department of Agriculture. However, the appointment was withdrawn on July 4, 2017.

References

External links
Representative Donald L. Moffitt (R) 58th District at the Illinois General Assembly
By session: 98th, 97th, 96th, 95th, 94th, 93rd
 
Don Moffitt's official website

Republican Party members of the Illinois House of Representatives
1947 births
Living people
21st-century American politicians
People from Galesburg, Illinois
Mayors of places in Illinois
People from Knoxville, Illinois
People from Oneida, Illinois
County officials in Illinois
County board members in Illinois